This is a list of African-American newspapers that have been published in Wisconsin.  It includes both current and historical newspapers.

The total number of African Americans in Wisconsin prior to 1900 was less than 1,000, and the growth of Wisconsin's African-American newspapers was commensurately delayed.

The first such newspaper in Wisconsin is generally considered to be the Wisconsin Afro-American, which George A. Brown (son of Bishop John Mifflin Brown) and Thomas H. Jones launched in 1892. The status of the Wisconsin Afro-American as a genuine African-American newspaper has been disputed, however. In that case, the first such paper in Wisconsin would be the Wisconsin Weekly Advocate, launched in 1898.

The first newspaper published by an African American in Wisconsin was launched several years before either of these:  George Edwin Taylor published the Wisconsin Labor Advocate for workers of all races from 1886 to 1887.

Notable African-American newspapers in Wisconsin today include The Madison Times, The Milwaukee Courier, The Milwaukee Times, and The Milwaukee Community Journal.

Newspapers

See also 

List of African-American newspapers and media outlets
List of African-American newspapers in Illinois
List of African-American newspapers in Iowa
List of African-American newspapers in Michigan
List of African-American newspapers in Minnesota
List of newspapers in Wisconsin

Works cited

References 

Newspapers
Wisconsin
African-American
African-American newspapers